Donovan Smith is an American football quarterback for Houston. He previously played college football for Texas Tech.

Early life and high school career
Smith originally attended Bishop Gorman High School in Las Vegas, Nevada, mainly playing as a wide receiver while also serving as the team's backup quarterback. Donovan would transfer to Frenship High School in the Lubbock, Texas suburb of Wolfforth prior to the 2019–20 school year. Smith finished his senior season completing 212-of-328 passes for 3,114 yards with 26 touchdowns and 8 interceptions along with 489 rushing yards and 14 rushing touchdowns. Smith finished his senior year with the 32nd-most passing yards in the state of Texas for the 2019 season.

Smith was listed as a three-star recruit by 247Sports.com coming out of high school. He committed to Texas Tech over Nevada, San Diego State, and Utah State.

High school statistics

Source:

College career

Texas Tech
Smith suffered a shoulder injury prior to the 2020 season, and did not appear in any games during the season. He had surgery on his shoulder and returned to practice the following spring.

Smith entered the team's week nine game against Oklahoma in the second quarter after starter Henry Colombi was shaken up on a tackle. Smith made his first collegiate start in the team's week 11 game against Iowa State, with original starter Tyler Shough still recovering from a broken collarbone he suffered in week 4 and Colombi out due to an illness. Smith finished the game 25-of-32 for 322 yards with three touchdowns and one interception as the Red Raiders won 41–38, becoming bowl eligible for the first time since 2017. For his performance, Smith was named the Big 12 Newcomer of the Week. Following the game, interim head coach Sonny Cumbie stated that Smith would remain the team's starting quarterback. The Red Raiders were invited to the Liberty Bowl, playing against Mississippi State. Smith finished the game with 252 passing yards and a touchdown along with a rushing touchdown in the 34–7 win and was named the game's MVP.

Entering into the 2022 season, Smith was in a competition for the starting quarterback position against Tyler Shough and Behren Morton. Shough was named the team's week one starter on August 21. Shough started the game against Murray State, but exited the game after the first quarter due to a possible injury and was replaced by Smith. In Week 2, Smith started Texas Tech's game against no. 25 Houston. The Red Raiders jumped out to a 17–3 halftime lead, but the Cougars stormed back in the second half due in part to three interceptions by Smith, including one that was returned 54 yards for a touchdown. Houston took a 20–17 lead with 0:37 left in regulation before Smith led the offense down field to tie the game 20–20 with a 47-yard field goal from Trey Wolff; the Red Raiders would win the game 33–30 in double overtime, with Smith scoring the game-winning touchdown on a 9-yard run. Smith finished with a career-high 350 yards passing and three total touchdowns, two passing and one rushing. For his performance, Smith was named the Big 12 Offensive Player of the Week. Two weeks later, against no. 22 Texas, Smith threw for 331 yards and two touchdowns along with 42 rushing yards and a rushing touchdown in the 37–34 overtime victory. For his performance against Texas, Smith was named the Earl Campbell Tyler Rose Award National Player of the Week. In the regular season finale against Oklahoma, Smith had both a rushing and receiving touchdown. On December 5, it was announced that Smith would be entering the NCAA transfer portal.

Houston 
On December 21, 2022, Smith transferred to Houston.

Statistics

Source:

Personal life
Smith's father, DeAndre, was the running backs coach for Texas Tech from 2019 to 2021. As of 2022, he is the running backs coach for the New York Giants in the NFL.

References

External links
Texas Tech Red Raiders bio
Houston Cougars bio

Living people
American football quarterbacks
Texas Tech Red Raiders football players
Players of American football from Nevada
Year of birth missing (living people)
Houston Cougars football players